Adam Moleyns (died 9 January 1450), Bishop of Chichester, was an English bishop, lawyer, royal administrator and diplomat. During the minority of Henry VI of England, he was clerk of the ruling council of the Regent.

Life

Moleyns had the living of Kempsey from 1433. He was Dean of Salisbury from 1441 to 1446. He became bishop of Chichester on 24 September 1445, and was consecrated bishop on 6 February 1446. He was Lord Privy Seal in 1444, at the same time that he was Protonotary of the Holy See. In 1447 he had permission to fortify the manor house at Bexhill.

Moleyns was a correspondent of the humanist Aeneas Silvius Piccolomini, Pope Pius II, who complimented him in a letter of 29 May 1444: "And I congratulate you and England, since you care for the art of rhetoric". In 1926 George Warner attributed The Libelle of Englyshe Polycye (1435–38) to Moleyns but this theory was partly based on Warner's mistaken identification of Adam Moleyns as a member of the family's Lancashire branch.  The theory of Moleyns' authorship of the poem is now rejected by most historians and scholars.

An active partisan of the unpopular William de la Pole, Duke of Suffolk, Moleyns was lynched in Portsmouth by discontented unpaid soldiers on 9 January 1450.

Notes

Citations

References

Further reading

Reeves, A.C., Lancastrian Englishmen (Washington: University Press of America) 1981. One of five fifteenth-century careers outlined through documents.

1450 deaths
Bishops of Chichester
Deans of Salisbury
Archdeacons of Salisbury
Archdeacons of Taunton
Lords Privy Seal
15th-century English Roman Catholic bishops
Year of birth unknown
Lynching deaths